The 2018–19 UEFA Europa League knockout phase began on 12 February and ended on 29 May 2019 with the final at the Olympic Stadium in Baku, Azerbaijan, to decide the champions of the 2018–19 UEFA Europa League. A total of 32 teams competed in the knockout phase.

For the first time, the video assistant referee (VAR) system was used in the competition, where it was implemented in the final.

Times are CET/CEST, as listed by UEFA (local times, if different, are in parentheses).

Round and draw dates
The schedule was as follows (all draws were held at the UEFA headquarters in Nyon, Switzerland).

Matches may also be played on Tuesdays or Wednesdays instead of the regular Thursdays due to scheduling conflicts.

Format
Each tie in the knockout phase, apart from the final, is played over two legs, with each team playing one leg at home. The team that scores more goals on aggregate over the two legs advance to the next round. If the aggregate score is level, the away goals rule is applied, i.e. the team that scores more goals away from home over the two legs advances. If away goals are also equal, then extra time is played. The away goals rule is again applied after extra time, i.e. if there are goals scored during extra time and the aggregate score is still level, the visiting team advances by virtue of more away goals scored. If no goals are scored during extra time, the tie is decided by penalty shoot-out. In the final, which is played as a single match, if the score is level at the end of normal time, extra time is played, followed by penalty shoot-out if the score remains tied.

The mechanism of the draws for each round is as follows:
In the draw for the round of 32, the twelve group winners and the four third-placed teams from the Champions League group stage with the better group records are seeded, and the twelve group runners-up and the other four third-placed teams from the Champions League group stage are unseeded. The seeded teams are drawn against the unseeded teams, with the seeded teams hosting the second leg. Teams from the same group or the same association cannot be drawn against each other.
In the draws for the round of 16, quarter-finals and semi-finals, there are no seedings, and teams from the same group or the same association can be drawn against each other. As the draws for the quarter-finals and semi-finals are held together before the quarter-finals are played, the identity of the quarter-final winners is not known at the time of the semi-final draw. A draw is also held to determine which semi-final winner is designated as the "home" team for the final (for administrative purposes as it is played at a neutral venue).

For the round of 16, quarter-finals and semi-finals, teams from the same city (e.g., Chelsea and Arsenal) are not scheduled to play at home on the same day, due to logistics and crowd control. To avoid such scheduling conflict, an adjustment had to be made by UEFA. For the round of 32, since both teams were drawn to play at home for the second leg, the home match of the team which were not domestic cup champions in the qualifying season, or the team with the lower domestic ranking (if neither team were the domestic cup champions, e.g. Arsenal FC for this season), was moved to an earlier time on Thursday. For the round of 16, quarter-finals and semi-finals if the two teams are drawn to play at home for the same leg, the order of legs of the tie involving the team with the lower priority – in this case Arsenal FC because Chelsea won the FA Cup last season – is reversed from the original draw.

On 17 July 2014, the UEFA emergency panel ruled that Ukrainian and Russian clubs would not be drawn against each other "until further notice" due to the political unrest between the countries.

Qualified teams
The knockout phase involved 32 teams: the 24 teams which qualified as winners and runners-up of each of the twelve groups in the group stage, and the eight third-placed teams from the Champions League group stage.

Europa League group stage winners and runners-up

Champions League group stage third-placed teams

Bracket

Round of 32
The draw for the round of 32 was held on 17 December 2018, 13:00 CET.

Summary
The first legs were played on 12 and 14 February, and the second legs were played on 20 and 21 February 2019.

|}

Matches

Dinamo Zagreb won 4–2 on aggregate.

Red Bull Salzburg won 5–2 on aggregate.

Inter Milan won 5–0 on aggregate.

Slavia Prague won 4–1 on aggregate.

1–1 on aggregate; Krasnodar won on away goals.

Napoli won 5–1 on aggregate.

Chelsea won 5–1 on aggregate.

Eintracht Frankfurt won 6–3 on aggregate.

Valencia won 3–0 on aggregate.

Rennes won 6–4 on aggregate.

Dynamo Kyiv won 3–2 on aggregate.

Sevilla won 3–0 on aggregate.

Zenit Saint Petersburg won 3–2 on aggregate.

Villarreal won 2–1 on aggregate.

Arsenal won 3–1 on aggregate.

Benfica won 2–1 on aggregate.

Round of 16
The draw for the round of 16 was held on 22 February 2019, 13:00 CET.

Summary
The first legs were played on 7 March, and the second legs were played on 14 March 2019.

|}
Notes

Matches

Chelsea won 8–0 on aggregate.

Eintracht Frankfurt won 1–0 on aggregate.

Benfica won 3–1 on aggregate.

Napoli won 4–3 on aggregate.

Valencia won 3–2 on aggregate.

Slavia Prague won 6–5 on aggregate.

Arsenal won 4–3 on aggregate.

Villarreal won 5–2 on aggregate.

Quarter-finals
The draw for the quarter-finals was held on 15 March 2019, 13:00 CET.

Summary
The first legs were played on 11 April, and the second legs were played on 18 April 2019.

|}
Notes

Matches

Arsenal won 3–0 on aggregate.

Valencia won 5–1 on aggregate.

4–4 on aggregate; Eintracht Frankfurt won on away goals.

Chelsea won 5–3 on aggregate.

Semi-finals
The draw for the semi-finals was held on 15 March 2019, 13:00 CET (after the quarter-final draw).

Summary
The first legs were played on 2 May, and the second legs were played on 9 May 2019.

|}

Matches

Arsenal won 7–3 on aggregate.

2–2 on aggregate; Chelsea won 4–3 on penalties.

Final

The final was played on 29 May 2019 at the Olympic Stadium in Baku. The "home" team (for administrative purposes) was determined by an additional draw held after the quarter-final and semi-final draws.

Notes

References

External links

3
February 2019 sports events in Europe
March 2019 sports events in Europe
April 2019 sports events in Europe
May 2019 sports events in Europe
UEFA Europa League knockout phases